The 2015 BBL Playoffs was the concluding postseason of the 2014–15 Basketball Bundesliga season. The Playoffs started on 9 May and ended on 21 June 2015.

Playoff qualifying

Bracket

Quarterfinals
The quarterfinals were played in a best of five format from 6 to 20 May 2015.

Brose Baskets vs MHP Riesen Ludwigsburg

Alba Berlin vs EWE Baskets Oldenburg

Bayern Munich vs Skyliners Frankfurt

Telekom Baskets Bonn vs ratiopharm Ulm

Semifinals
The semifinals were played in a best of five format from 23 May to 4 June 2015.

Brose Baskets vs ratiopharm Ulm

Alba Berlin vs Bayern Munich

Finals
The Finals were played in a best of five format from 7 to 21 June 2015.

References

External links
German League official website  

Playoffs
BBL Playoffs